Oenopota lutkeana is a species of sea snail, a marine gastropod mollusk in the family Mangeliidae.

Description
The length of this rare shell attains 12 mm, its diameter 5.5 mm.

The brownish shell has an ovate-fusiform shape. It contains 6 whorls with the spire scarcely angulate next to the suture. The sculpture consists of numerous longitudinal lines and 18–20 spiral plications. These are little prominent divided as it were in the middle above a longitudinal line and reaching the line in the last whorl.

Distribution
This marine species occurs in the St. Lawrence Bay, Bering Strait

References

External links
  Tucker, J.K. 2004 Catalog of recent and fossil turrids (Mollusca: Gastropoda). Zootaxa 682:1–1295
 Biolib.cz: Oenopota lutkeana

lutkeana
Gastropods described in 1886